The 2016–17 FC Terek Grozny season was the eighth successive season that the club was play in the Russian Premier League, the highest tier of association football in Russia, and 7th in total. Terek Grozny finished the season in 5th position, narrowly missing out on the Europa League, whilst they were knocked out of the Russian Cup at the Round of 16 stage by Ufa.

Squad

Youth squad

Transfers

Summer

In:

Out:

In

Out

Loans in

Released

Competitions

Russian Premier League

Results by round

Matches

League table

Russian Cup

Squad statistics

Appearances and goals

|-
|colspan="14"|Players away from the club on loan:
|-
|colspan="14"|Players who appeared for Terek Grozny no longer at the club:

|}

Goal Scorers

Disciplinary Record

References

External links
Official website 

FC Akhmat Grozny seasons
Terek Grozny